This is a list of cricketers who have played for Shropshire County Cricket Club in List A matches. Shropshire, one of the Minor Counties, played 26 List A cricket matches – a one-day, limited overs form of cricket – between 1974 and 2005. After making their List A debut in the 1974 Gillette Cup the county played once in both the 1976 and 1978 editions of the competition. Minor counties were not a regular feature of List A competitions at the time and Shropshire played 15 matches in the NatWest Trophy between 1983 and 2000 before playing eight matches in the Cheltenham & Gloucester Trophy between 2001 and 2005.

The knock-out nature of the Gillette Cup means that in most competitions Shropshire only played one match, most often against a first-class county. They won six matches during the time they competed in List A competitions, the first win coming against Yorkshire, a first-class county, in the 1984 NatWest Trophy. This was the only time the team was successful against first-class opposition, although the county reached the third round of List A competitions in 2000 and 2002, beating other Minor Counties or Cricket Boards, as well as winning against Ireland in 2000.

Players are listed alphabetically. Most players also made appearances for Shropshire in the Minor Counties Championship and some represented other sides in top-class cricket.

A
Abdul Hafeez (English cricketer)
John Abrahams
Stephen Adshead
Jonathan Anders
Nicholas Archibald
Derek Ashley
Asif Din

B
Mark Bamford (cricketer)
Andrew Barnard (cricketer)
Paul Blakeley
David Boden
Duncan Bowett
Cedric Boyns
Peter Bradley (cricketer)
Richard Burton (cricketer, born 1976)
Robert Burton (cricketer, born 1943)
Adam Byram
Gavin Byram

C
Rodney Cass
Duncan Catterall
Michael Cronin (cricketer)

D
Michael Davidson (cricketer, born 1970)
Mark Davies (cricketer, born 1962)
William Davies (cricketer, born 1972)
Peter Dawson (cricketer)
Somachandra de Silva
Mark Downes

E
Geoffrey Edmunds
Scott Ellis (cricketer)
Kevin Evans (cricketer)

F
Gary Fellows
John Foster (cricketer)

G
Stephen Gale
Ian Gillespie (cricketer)

H
Geoffrey Hayes (cricketer)
Colin Hemsley
Guy Home
John Hulme (Shropshire cricketer)
Ian Hutchinson (cricketer)

J
Andy Johnson (cricketer)
Steve Johnson (cricketer)
Bryan Jones (cricketer)

K
Kamran Sheeraz

M
Andrew Mackelworth
Maisam Hasnain
Dean Marsh
Marcus Marvell
Tim Mason (cricketer)
Babu Meman
Gareth Mumford
Mushtaq Mohammad

N
Malcolm Nash

O
Anthony O'Connor (cricketer)
Steve Ogrizovic
Philip Oliver (cricketer)
Geoffrey Othen

P
Derrick Page
Tony Parton
Brian Perry (cricketer)
Duncan Perry
Ben Platt (cricketer)
Paul Pridgeon

R
James Ralph (cricketer)
Peter Ranells
John Roberts (Shropshire cricketer)
Mark Robinson (Shropshire cricketer)
Chris Rogers (cricketer)

S
Brian Shantry
Kevin Sharp (cricketer)
Adam Shimmons
Maninder Singh (cricketer)
Doug Slade
Joseph Smith (cricketer)
Neil Smith (cricketer, born 1967)
John Swinburne (cricketer)

T
Paul Thomas (cricketer)
Matthew Tilt
Giles Toogood
Matthew Turner (cricketer)

W
Jason Weaver (cricketer)
Jono Whitney
Andrew Williams (Shropshire cricketer)
Dominic Williamson
Philip Wormald

Y
David York

References

Shropshire County Cricket Club
Shropshire List A
 
Cricketers